The 2022 election of the President of the Bohemian-Moravian Confederation of Trade Unions (ČMKOS) was held on 29 April 2022. Josef Středula was reelected for his third term.

Background
The incumbent President Josef Středula leads Bohemian-Moravian Confederation of Trade Unions since 2014. He was reelected in 2018. He decided to run for his third term in 2022.

Results
Středula was the only candidate. 173 delegates voted. Středula received 153 votes and thus was reelected.

Aftermath
Středula's victory renewed speculations about his potential candidacy in the upcoming Czech presidential election. Středula himself admitted that he considers candidacy. The incumbent Czech president Miloš Zeman endorsed Středula for president following the election. Středula announced his candidacy on 5 May 2022.

See also 

 2014 ČMKOS presidential election

References

Histadrut
Bohemian-Moravian Confederation of Trade Unions
Trade union elections
Non-partisan elections